Duke of Tamames is a hereditary title in the Peerage of Spain, accompanied by the dignity of Grandee and granted in 1805 by Charles IV to Antonio María Mesía del Barco, 22nd Lord of Tamames and 7th Marquess of Campollano.

Dukes of Tamames (1805)

Antonio María Mesía del Barco y Castro, 1st Duke of Tamames
José María Mesía del Barco y Garro, 2nd Duke of Tamames
José Mesía del Barco y Pando, 3rd Duke of Tamames
José Mesía del Barco y Gayoso de los Cobos, 4th Duke of Tamames
José María Mesía del Barco y Fitz-James Stuart, 5th Duke of Tamames
Juan María Mesía del Barco y Lesseps, 6th Duke of Tamames
José Luis Mesía y Figueroa, 7th Duke of Tamames

See also
List of dukes in the peerage of Spain
List of current Grandees of Spain

References 

Dukedoms of Spain
Grandees of Spain
Lists of dukes
Lists of Spanish nobility